The 2022 Asian Airgun Championships were held at Daegu International Shooting Range, Daegu, South Korea between 9 and 19 November 2022.

Medal summary

Men

Women

Mixed

Junior Men

Junior Women

Junior Mixed

Youth Men

Youth Women

Medal table

References

Asian Shooting Championships
Asian Airgun Championships